Bad Lip Reading is a YouTube channel created and run by an anonymous producer who intentionally lip-reads video clips poorly, for comedic effect. Rolling Stone described the channel as "the breakout hit" of the 2012 United States presidential cycle.  As of November 2020, the channel had amassed over 8.02 million subscribers and over a billion video views. Some of the channel's original songs are available on Spotify and Apple Music.

History 
The "Bad Lip Reader" behind the channel is an anonymous music and video producer from Texas. The first Bad Lip Reading video released was a spoof of Rebecca Black's song "Friday", entitled "Gang Fight".  New music and lyrics were matched to Black's video to make it appear as though she were singing about gang warfare. The "Gang Fight" YouTube video, released in March 2011, earned BLR a million hits and thousands of subscribers.

More spoof videos followed, including interpretations of The Black Eyed Peas' "Boom Boom Pow" (a viral video called "Everybody Poops"); Taylor Swift's "Our Song" ("(Rockin') All Nite Long"); and Michael Bublé's "Haven't Met You Yet".  The latter was transformed into the "electronica-inspired" "Russian Unicorn", which Bublé himself praised as his "new favorite song" and "one of the coolest things I've ever seen".

In September 2011, BLR branched out from pop singers to politicians with a "bad lip-reading" of Texas governor and US Presidential hopeful Rick Perry.  BLR replaced clips of Perry with invented dialogue matched to his lip movements.  After airing on The Ellen DeGeneres Show, the video was featured by news and media outlets across the United States, leading to a sudden surge in Bad Lip Reading's popularity.  Following the Perry spoof, BLR released bad lip-readings of President Obama, Republican presidential candidates Michele Bachmann, Mitt Romney, Herman Cain, Ron Paul, Newt Gingrich, and Rick Santorum.

The channel found even more success in November 2012 when it began overdubbing popular movie and television shows. BLR's version of Twilight quickly went viral, followed by parodies of The Hunger Games; The Walking Dead; and Game of Thrones.  The videos have been well-received not only by the public, but also by the cast and creators of the properties being spoofed. In her online blog, Elizabeth Banks, Jennifer Lawrence's co-star in The Hunger Games, said, "Bad Lip Reading is awesome. I was introduced to it by none other than Jennifer Lawrence. Yup — she saw this, people. And she laughed. And so did I. A lot." Lawrence's co-star Josh Hutcherson also praised the video, tweeting it to his fans. The cast and creators of The Walking Dead have publicly praised the Bad Lip Reading "Walking Dead" videos on several occasions.

Expanding his scope yet again, in January 2013 BLR released a bad lip reading of National Football League players, coaches, and referees, which became the channel's most popular video. A second NFL video followed in 2014, and a third was released in 2015. The NFL Bad Lip Reading video became an annual event for the channel, with each video being released shortly before the Super Bowl.

In December 2015, Bad Lip Reading simultaneously released three new videos, one for each of the three films in the original Star Wars trilogy. These videos used guest voices for the first time, featuring Jack Black as Darth Vader, Maya Rudolph as Princess Leia, and Bill Hader in multiple roles. The Empire Strikes Back BLR video featured a scene of Yoda singing to Luke Skywalker about an unfortunate encounter with a seagull on the beach. BLR later expanded this scene into a full-length stand-alone song called "Seagulls! (Stop It Now)", which was released in November 2016 (eventually hitting #1 on the Billboard Comedy Digital Tracks chart.) As of December 2018, the video for "Seagulls! (Stop It Now)" is Bad Lip Reading's most viewed YouTube upload and most popular musical production. In the song, Yoda sings to Luke Skywalker about the dangers posed by vicious seagulls if one dares to go to the beach. Mark Hamill, who played Luke Skywalker in the Star Wars films, publicly praised "Seagulls!" (and Bad Lip Reading in general) while speaking at Star Wars Celebration in 2017: "I love them, and I showed Carrie [Fisher] the Yoda one… we were dying. I showed it to her in her trailer. She loved it. I retweeted it… and [BLR] contacted me and said ‘Do you want to do Bad Lip Reading?’ And I said, ‘I’d love to…’”. Hamill and Bad Lip Reading collaborated on Bad Lip Reading's version of The Force Awakens, with Hamill providing the voice of Han Solo. As of July 16, 2020, the video has more than 111 million views.

The Star Wars Trilogy Bad Lip Reading videos also spawned a second musical number titled "Bushes of Love", which featured Ben Kenobi singing to Luke Skywalker about the perils of love. The song hit #2 on the Billboard Comedy Digital Tracks chart. Hamilton creator and star Lin-Manuel Miranda described the song as "THE summer jam of 2017".

In January 2017, BLR released a Bad Lip Reading of Donald Trump's inauguration, which quickly went viral, amassing over 36 million views in 2017 alone. YouTube ranked the video at #7 on its list of the Top Ten Trending Videos of 2017.

In a Rolling Stone interview, the producer behind the Bad Lip Reading videos said that he first encountered the technique of lip reading when his mother, then in her 40s, lost her hearing due to unknown causes. While she excelled at lip reading, he was unable to pick up the skill despite trying: "I was terrible at it."

In 2013, Bad Lip Reading won the Webby Awards' People's Voice Award for "Comedy: Long Form or Series".  In April 2014, BLR won the American Comedy Award for Best Viral Video for its "NFL: A Bad Lip Reading" video. Patrick Stewart accepted the award on BLR's behalf during the televised ceremony on NBC.

On June 8, 2014 the BLR Facebook page announced the release of the full version of "Modify" by Kniles, a song that has been used in multiple BLR productions. The fact that this song was used without previous attribution, as well as stylistic similarities to other BLR-produced songs, have prompted speculation that Kniles is another pseudonym for the individual behind Bad Lip Reading.

A Bad Lip Reading of the Disney Channel original movie High School Musical premiered as a half-hour special on July 11, 2016 on Disney XD. Similarly, a half-hour Bad Lip Reading version of Descendants aired on November 18, 2017.

In May 2018, BLR released "Royal Wedding", a Bad Lip Reading of the wedding of Prince Harry and Meghan Markle. The video quickly went viral, amassing millions of hits. When YouTube revealed the top trending videos of 2018, "Royal Wedding" ranked third in the UK, just behind the actual wedding itself.

In March 2019, BLR released "Chocolate Lagoon", a Bad Lip Reading of the live performance of "Shallow" by Bradley Cooper and Lady Gaga at the 91st Academy Awards ceremony. On Christmas Day, 25 December 2019, they released another Star Wars-themed music video, "My Stick", which is a sequel to "Seagulls! (Stop It Now)".

A Halloween-themed song called "Monster Run," was uploaded on Halloween 2020, and is another spoof of BTS.

In July 2022, BLR released a five-part interpretation of the musical Hamilton. Re-imagined as "Axe-Assassin Albertson", the project revolves around a post-apocalyptic backstory in which an Artificial Intelligence in the year 2122 attempts to restore the missing soundtrack to Hamilton by analyzing the lips of the performers. In addition to replacing several of the production's musical numbers with original songs featuring nonsensical lyrics, many songs were transformed into spoken word dialogue scenes. Upon its release, Hamilton creator Lin-Manuel Miranda shared the video with his fans: "Thanks @badlipreading. You've made my life." Bad Lip Reading himself tweeted that the project was begun as a way of personally coping with the Covid-19 pandemic. An accompanying 10-song Axe-Assassin Albertson album was released on July 17, 2022, featuring full-length versions of all the songs heard in the video series.

Copyright issues 
One of Bad Lip Reading's works, "Dirty Spaceman", a redubbing of "Check It Out" by Will.i.am featuring Nicki Minaj, was taken down due to a claim of copyright infringement. It is unclear whether Universal Music issued a formal DMCA takedown request or else YouTube's Content ID Match system detected the work and removed it automatically.

In March 2012, the video "Beard With Glue", a bad lip reading of "You're Beautiful" by James Blunt, was taken down by Warner Music Group on a copyright claim. Unlike "Dirty Spaceman", the claim was soon released, however, and the video was returned. "Gang Fight" had been similarly taken down the previous year, in 2011, but returned. UMG has also taken down "(Rockin') All Nite Long", the Taylor Swift spoof that features Wiz Khalifa. BLR's parody of "Hot Problems", "Time to Rock", was also taken down, but later returned.

BLR did a redubbing of "Girls Like You" by Maroon 5 called "Haiku", released on 12 October 2018, but the video was taken down later the same day.

Another bad lip reading of "You Need To Calm Down" by Taylor Swift, "Lushfull", was taken down in June 2019.

Videos

Based on songs

Songs created by BLR and published under other identities

1 Song also featured in BLR's "Royal Wedding" video (May 22, 2018)

2 Song also featured in BLR's "Star Wars" video (Dec 16, 2015)

3 Source: YouTube video

4 Source: Holy waterloo single Apple Music

5 Source: Don't fight the warmth single Apple music

Based on movies and TV shows

Other videos

See also 
List of YouTubers

References

External links 

American Internet celebrities
Internet memes
Maker Studios channels
YouTube channels launched in 2011